Michael Baisden (born June 26, 1963) is a nationally syndicated radio personality and host of The Michael Baisden Show.  The show is currently syndicated by Baisden Media Group in partnership with SupeRadio and AURN (American Urban Radio Networks). The show airs weekday afternoons. The show was previously syndicated by Cumulus Media and was heard in over 78 media markets nationwide with over 8 million listeners daily. His media career began when he left his job driving trains in Chicago to self-publish Never Satisfied, and began touring the country selling books out of the trunk of his car.

Baisden is a NY Times best-selling author with over 2 million books in print, hosted two national television shows, and has produced three films.

Producer and filmmaker 
Baisden has produced: two national stage plays (based on Baisden's novels); Love Lust & Lies, an award-winning documentary dealing with relationships and sexuality based on the perspectives of people of color; two seminar tapes, Relationship Seminar and Men Have Issues Too; and a web-based community portal. In 2011 Baisden produced, wrote, and directed the documentary Do Women Know What They Want?

Motivational speaker
Baisden has toured the US as a motivational speaker with his Love, Lust & Lies Relationship Seminar Series. As well as numerous national Baisden Live Tours, he has also produced international Island Jam events in Jamaica.

Radio career
Baisden got his start in radio as an unpaid afternoon drive-time host for 98.7 KISS FM in New York City, taking the station rating from number nine to number one in the time slot. The show debuted nationally in 2005.

Baisden's show recently returned to national radio in January 2017. The flagship station for the show was WALR-FM (Kiss 104.1 FM) in Atlanta, Georgia once the show was returned to national radio, but on November 27 of the same year, WALR-FM revamped its line-up and started producing local shows therefore getting rid of all syndicated shows.

Baisden After Dark
In 2007-08, Baisden hosted and co-produced Baisden After Dark, a late-night television talk show series on TV One. The show featured comedian George Willborn and musician Morris Day, who conducted the house band.

Social activism and community leadership
On September 20, 2007, Baisden spearheaded the Jena Six March in Jena, Louisiana. In January 2008, he endorsed Barack Obama for president of the United States.

Michael Baisden Foundation
The Michael Baisden Foundation is a non-profit organization formed to promote literacy and to provide mentors for at-risk youths.

The Michael Baisden Foundation's various projects include:
 Jena Six March
 Free Clinics
 One Million Mentors National Campaign to Save Our Kids
 Gospel for Teens / Mama Foundation Auditions - Honorary Judge
 Partnership with Black and Missing Foundation
 Mentoring Brothers partnership with Big Brothers Big Sisters & Black Fraternities

Appearances
 6th Annual Jazz in the Gardens - Host
 Soul Train Awards - Presenter
 Heart and Soul Magazine Awards - Presenter
 CNN's Black in America, 2008
 39th Annual NAACP Image Awards - Presenter

Awards
Dr. Martin Luther King Jr. Keepers of the Dream Award
Key to the City, Shreveport, LA
Key to the City, Alexandria, LA
Key to the City, Dallas, TX
Key to the City Florence, AL
Key to the City Patterson, LA
Mayor's Key - Columbia, SC
The NCNW Savannah Youth Section 2010 Mir Award - Savannah, GA
Key to the City - Columbus, GA
Columbus, Georgia Proclamation - Friday, March 12, 2010 "Michael Baisden 'One Million Mentors' Day"
City of Mobile, Alabama Proclamation - Wednesday, March 10, 2010 as "Michael Baisden Day"
Black Achievers Determined to be Different (BADD) Certificate of Membership - "The BADD Men Brotherhood"
Honorary Mayor-President of the city of Baton Rouge, Parish of East Baton Rouge - February 25, 2010
Honorary Citizen of the City of Florence, Alabama
Key to the City - Florence, LA
Key to the City - Mobile, AL
Key to the City - Tampa, FL
Key to the City - Morgan City, LA
Key to the City - Lafayette City, LA
Key to the City - Monroe, LA
Key to the City - Baton Rouge, LA
I Make the Difference Award
City of Orlando, FL Proclamation - "March 4, 2010 as 'One Million Mentor's Campaign to Save Our Kids' Day"
Congratulations and Commendation from State Rep. Herbert B. Dixon - Louisiana House of Representatives
Key to the City, St. Mary Parish - Louisiana
Mentoring Brothers In Action Inspiration Award Presented by Big Brothers Big Sisters and Max Miller, Big Brothers Big Sisters Co-Chief Executive Officer

BooksRaise Your Hand If You Have Issues (2014)Maintenance Man II (2012)The Maintenance Man Collectors Edition (2012)Do Men Know What They Want? (2011)God's Gift to Women (2003)Men Cry In The Dark (1999)Never Satisfied How & Why Men Cheat'' (1997)

References

External links

African American Literature Book Club
www.minglecity.com Mingle City

20th-century American dramatists and playwrights
African-American atheists
American atheists
African-American radio personalities
American motivational speakers
American talk radio hosts
Chicago Vocational High School alumni
Writers from Chicago
1963 births
Living people
Westwood One
20th-century African-American writers
21st-century African-American people